PacifiCorp is an electric power company in the western United States.

PacifiCorp has two business units:
 Pacific Power, a regulated electric utility with service territory throughout Oregon, northern California, and southeastern Washington.
 Rocky Mountain Power, a regulated electric utility with service territory throughout Utah, Wyoming, and southeastern Idaho.
PacifiCorp operates one of the largest privately held transmission systems in the U.S. within the western Energy Imbalance Market.

Pacific Power and Rocky Mountain Power combined serve over 1.6 million residential customers, 202,000 commercial customers, and 37,000 industrial and irrigation customers - for a total of approximately 1,813,000 customers. The company owns and maintain  of long distance transmission lines,  of distribution lines, and 900 substations.

History

Pacific Power & Light was formed in 1910 from the merger of several financially troubled utilities in Oregon and Washington to form the Pacific Power & Light Company.  It gradually expanded its reach to include most of Oregon, as well as portions of California, Washington and Wyoming.  In 1984, it reorganized itself as a holding company, PacifiCorp, headquartered in Portland with Pacific Power as its main subsidiary.

Utah Power and Light (UP&L) was organized on 6 September 1912 from the merger of four electric companies in Utah, Idaho and Wyoming and was a Salt Lake City subsidiary of a large holding company, Electric Bond and Share Company (EBASCO) of New York. Within four years of its organization, UP&L had purchased twenty-seven other electric companies in the general Utah area, and eventually absorbed more than one hundred thirty. In 1881, one of those companies had made Salt Lake City the fifth city in the world with central station electricity.

In 1954, Pacific Power & Light merged with the Mountain States Power Company, essentially doubling the company's service area. In 1961, the company purchased the California Oregon Power Company, extending its service into southern Oregon and northern California.

In 1977, PacifiCorp spun off its coal mining interests into a mining company known as NERCO, which was eventually listed on the New York Stock Exchange and ranked as high as 353 on the Fortune 500 list of the largest American companies.  Through its majority interest in NERCO, PacifiCorp was involved in the mining of coal, oil, natural gas, gold, silver, and uranium.  PacifiCorp still owned 82% of NERCO in 1993, when it was acquired by the mining giant Rio Tinto Group.

In 1987, PacifiCorp acquired Utah Power & Light. After the merger with regulator approval on January 9, 1989, Pacific Power and Utah Power operated as divisions of PacifiCorp.

In 2001, PacifiCorp was purchased by Scottish Power. Since 2006, PacifiCorp has been a wholly owned subsidiary of Berkshire Hathaway Energy (formerly MidAmerican), itself an affiliate of Berkshire Hathaway.

In a July 2006 reorganization, Pacific Power's territory in central and eastern Wyoming was merged with the Utah Power territory to form Rocky Mountain Power.

In September 2021, PacifiCorp presented a plan to keep 3 out of 22 coal power plants operational beyond 2040 and to source 56% of its yearly consumption with renewable energy by 2040.

Operations
PacifiCorp owns, maintains and operates generation assets and manages the commercial and trading operations of the company. PacifiCorp owns 68 generating plants with a capacity of 9,140 megawatts.  70.6%  of the generation is from thermal sources (i.e., coal or natural gas), 6.7% from hydroelectric sources, and 0.2% from renewable sources.  22.5% of PacifiCorp's generation is purchased from other suppliers or under contracts.

Generation resources
In these tables of generation properties owned or partially-owned by PacifiCorp, total capacity is 10,556MW.  Of this, 56% is coal, 24% is natural gas, 10% is hydroelectric, and 10% is renewable.

Major generation facilities include:

Thermal generation (Fossil Fueled)

Hydroelectric Generation

Renewable generation

Coal mining

PacifiCorp also owns and operates several captive coal mines located at or very near some of its generation plants. In Wyoming, PacifiCorp operates and has partial interest in Jim Bridger Mine and owns the Dave Johnston Mine, which is in final reclamation. The company also owned and operated the Deer Creek Mine in Utah, near the Huntington Plant but closed it in 2015 and has a partial interest in the Trapper Mine in Colorado.

Electric vehicles 
Calling it a "new era of utility involvement in transportation electrification," the Portland Business Journal in 2018 described PacifiCorp's electric vehicle promotion program as a plan that promises new electric vehicle charging sites, outreach and education efforts. The program was spawn from legislation passed in 2016 that called for more renewable energy from the state's utility companies.

Customers 
As of May 1, 2007, Rocky Mountain Power serves approximately 758,000 customers in Utah, 129,000 customers in Idaho, and 67,000 customers in Wyoming.

Net metering 
In November 2017, Rocky Mountain Power made a deal with Utah's utility authorities to phase out net metering. The program was paying customers who generated their own electricity with rooftop solar panels the residential rate for their excess energy that got sent back into the energy grid. As of August 2018, new rooftop solar installations were down 23 percent, likely due to the cancellation of the net metering program. New solar customers are paid by a transitional program that pays slightly less than the residential rate until 2033. People who installed solar panels prior to November 2017 are grandfathered at the previous rates until 2035.

Organization
PacifiCorp is headquartered in the Lloyd Center Tower at 825 N.E. Multnomah Street, Portland, Oregon, in the Lloyd District.  Pacific Power is also headquartered in the same building. Rocky Mountain Power is headquartered in Salt Lake City, Utah.

Pacific Power

Pacific Power serves customers in Washington, Oregon and California. Major cities served include:
California
Crescent City
Dunsmuir
Mount Shasta
Yreka
Oregon
Albany
Astoria
Bend
Coos Bay
Corvallis
Dallas
Grants Pass
Hermiston
Hood River
Independence
Junction City
Klamath Falls
Lebanon
Lincoln City
Medford
North Bend
Pendleton
Portland (parts of downtown, northern and eastern Portland; the rest of city is served by Portland General Electric.)
Prineville
Redmond
Roseburg
Stayton
Sweet Home
Washington
Walla Walla
Yakima

As of December 31, 2009, Pacific Power serves 555,070 customers in Oregon, 126,665 customers in Washington, and 45,148 customers in California.

Rocky Mountain Power

Rocky Mountain Power serves customers in Idaho, Utah, and Wyoming.

Major cities served include:

Idaho 
Ammon,
Lava Hot Springs,
Malad City,
Montpelier,
Preston,
Rigby,
Rexburg,
Saint Anthony,
Shelley

Utah 
Rocky Mountain Power serves most major cities in Utah, with the following exceptions:

Bountiful,
Kaysville,
Lehi,
Logan,
Provo,
Murray,
Monroe,
Monticello,
Springville,
St. George

Wyoming 
Buffalo,
Casper,
Cody,
Douglas,
Evanston,
Green River,
Kemmerer,
Lander,
Laramie,
Rawlins,
Riverton,
Rock Springs,
Thermopolis

References and sources

External links

Pacificorp home page
Pacific Power home page
Rocky Mountain Power home page
Berkshire Hathaway Energy home page

 
Berkshire Hathaway
Companies based in Portland, Oregon
Energy in Oregon
Superfund sites in Utah
Economy of the Northwestern United States
Electric power companies of the United States
Hydroelectric power companies of the United States
1984 establishments in Oregon